Ehmen is a district of Wolfsburg in Lower Saxony, Germany.

People 
 Barbara Otte-Kinast (born 1964), politician (CDU)

Wolfsburg